X: A Novel is a young adult novel by Ilyasah Shabazz and Kekla Magoon, published January 6, 2015 by Candlewick Press.

Reception 
X is a Junior Library Guild selection.

The book received starred review from Publishers Weekly, Kirkus Reviews, Booklist, Shelf Awareness, The Horn Book, and School Library Journal, as well as positive reviews from The New York Times Book Review, HuffPost, and Bulletin of the Center for Children's Books.

The Horn Book, School Library Journal, and Publishers Weekly named X one of the best books of the 2015.

References 

Novels set in Michigan
Novels set in Boston
Novels set in New York City
2015 children's books